The Ruellan brothers (in French les frères Ruellan) were French siblings from Paramé (now included in Saint-Malo), Brittany, who fought during the First World War. Ten brothers, from a family of thirteen children, were on the front lines. Six were killed in action, setting the record for the highest number of French siblings killed during World War I. A seventh brother, who had been exposed to a chemical agent during the war, died few years later of his injuries.

References

Sibling groups
People from Saint-Malo
French military personnel killed in World War I
Year of birth missing